Alexandru Mitu (born 9 March 1988) is a Romanian rugby union player who plays as a Flanker and Lock for CEC Bank SuperLiga club CSM București and has previously played for his home country Romania and will now make his debut for the Romanian national rugby 7's team.

References

External links
Superliga Player Profile
ItsRugby Player Profile
ESPN Scrum Player Profile

1988 births
Living people
Romanian rugby union players
Romania international rugby union players
Rugby union flankers
Rugby union locks